What's Wrong with This Picture? is the thirtieth studio album by Northern Irish singer-songwriter Van Morrison, released on 21 October 2003 by Blue Note Records.

The album received a Grammy Awards nomination for Morrison in the "Best Contemporary Blues Album" category. Two songs from the album charted on the Billboard Triple A Songs: "Once in a Blue Moon" (#16) and "Evening in June" (#20).

Track listing
All songs by Van Morrison, unless noted otherwise.

"What's Wrong with This Picture?" – 6:00
"Whinin Boy Moan" – 4:17
"Evening in June" – 4:00
"Too Many Myths" – 4:32
"Somerset" (Acker Bilk, David Collett, Morrison) – 4:09
"Meaning of Loneliness" – 6:41
"Stop Drinking" (Lightnin' Hopkins, Morrison) – 3:24
"Goldfish Bowl" – 6:01
"Once in a Blue Moon" – 3:30
"Saint James Infirmary" (Traditional) – 5:32
"Little Village" – 4:30
"Fame" – 5:21
"Get on with the Show" – 5:40

Personnel
Van Morrison – vocals, acoustic guitar, alto saxophone
Ned Edwards – acoustic and electric guitars, backing vocals
Johnny Scott – electric guitar, mandolin
Foggy Lyttle – electric guitar, backing vocals
Mick Green – electric guitar
Nicky Scott – bass guitar
Lee Goodall – alto and baritone saxophones, flute, backing vocals
Martin Winning – clarinet, tenor saxophone
Acker Bilk – clarinet
Keith Donald – bass clarinet
Matt Holland – trumpet, flugelhorn, backing vocals
Gavin Povey – piano
Richard Dunn – Hammond organ
David Hayes – bass guitar, backing vocals
Liam Bradley – drums, backing vocals
Bobby Irwin – drums
Alan Wicket – congas, washboard

Charts
Album – UK Album Chart

Album – Billboard (North America)

References

Van Morrison albums
2003 albums
Blue Note Records albums
Albums produced by Van Morrison